Mar Sebastian Mankuzhikary (2 March 1929 – 11 June 1994) was the first bishop of the Syro-Malabar Catholic Diocese of Thamarassery (Syro-Malabar Catholic Church) in Kerala, India.

Born in Thanneermukkom, Kerala, he was educated at seminaries in India and ordained a priest on 12 March 1955.  He subsequently studied philosophy at the Pontifical Gregorian University in Rome where he completed his doctoral dissertation in 1959, Metaphysical Vision of Tagore (published posthumously in 2000, ed. Joseph Therattil), a study on the writer, philosopher and Nobel laureate Rabindranath Tagore. After post-doctoral work at the Catholic University of Louvain and teaching at the St. Joseph's Pontifical Seminary in Kerala, he was ordained auxiliary bishop of Ernakulam and titular bishop of Arethusa dei Siriin on 15 November 1969 and became the first holder of the bishopric of Thamarassery in 1986.

References
 Mrs. Grace Mankuzhikary Therattil: `Kochangalayum Kochupithavum', June 2008.

External links
Data on Mar Sebastian Mankuzhikary at Catholic-Hierarchy.org 
Some biographical data and an image of Mar Sebastian Mankuzhikary

1929 births
1994 deaths
20th-century Eastern Catholic archbishops
20th-century Roman Catholic archbishops in India
Syro-Malabar Catholic Archbishops of Ernakulam-Angamaly
Malayali people
20th-century Indian Roman Catholic theologians